Flying Legends is a two-day airshow in England, held in July every year. The event took place for some 30 years at Duxford Aerodrome in Cambridgeshire, but after the 2020 event was cancelled due to the COVID-19 pandemic, the event planned to move to Sywell Aerodrome in Northamptonshire for 2021. This event too was cancelled on 28 May 2021.

In February 2023, it was formally announced by Flying Legends on their official website that the airshow would once again commence for 2023, this time at a new venue at Leeds East Airport in North Yorkshire, for the 15th and 16th of July 2023. 

The airshow features only warbird and vintage aircraft, such as the Supermarine Spitfire, Hawker Hurricane, North American P-51 Mustang and resident Boeing B-17 Flying Fortress Sally B. It is  run by The Fighter Collection, based at Duxford.

References

External links 

 Flying Legends Airshow
 The Fighter Collection

Air shows
Aviation in England